Judd is a brand of racing car engines built by Engine Developments Ltd., a company founded in 1971 by John Judd and Jack Brabham in Rugby, Warwickshire, England. Engine Developments was intended to build engines for Brabham's racing efforts, and became one of the first firms authorised by Cosworth to maintain and rebuild its DFV engines, but has since expanded into various areas of motorsport.

Judd has provided engines for many major series, including Formula One, Indycar and other smaller formula series, sports car racing, and touring car racing. They have been associated with manufacturers such as Yamaha, MG, Mazda and Honda, although they have mainly been a privateer-engine supplier.

Engine history

Lower formulae/IndyCar 

As a result of Jack Brabham's long-standing relationship with Honda, Judd was hired by them to develop an engine for the company's return to Formula Two in association with Ron Tauranac's Ralt team.

After the demise of Formula Two at the end of the 1984 season, Judd continued to develop new engines for Honda.  The first was the Judd AV, a turbocharged V8 engine built for Honda's CART campaign. It was first used on the CART circuit midway through the 1986 season, fielded by Galles Racing and driver Geoff Brabham. It was initially badged as the Brabham-Honda, and scored a fourth-place finish at the 1986 Michigan 500. In 1987, the engine was used for the first time at the Indianapolis 500. Brabham scored second-place finishes in 1987 at Pocono and Road America, as well as a third at the season finale at Miami.

The engine became known for its reliability and superior fuel mileage (particularly in the 500-mile races). However, it was at a decided power disadvantage compared to the top engine of the time, the Ilmor Chevrolet.

In 1988, Truesports with driver Bobby Rahal took over as the primary team, and the "Honda" name was dropped from the powerplant. During the 1988 season, Rahal took advantage of the engine's reliability in the 500-mile races, finishing fourth at Indy and second at the Michigan 500. He then scored the first and only Indycar victory for the Judd engine, at the Pocono 500. His ten top-10 finishes led to a third-place finish in the season points standings. Judd continued to build upgrades to the AV into the early 1990s, even after Honda had stopped badging the engines. When Honda moved into the new Formula 3000 series, Judd again developed the company's engine.  Based on the architecture of the AV, the new BV V8 was a naturally aspirated variant, and would eventually form the basis for the Judd CV Formula One engine.

KV 

After the company's departure from Formula One, Judd returned to Formula 3000 in 1995 with the development of the 3-litre KV V8 engine.  Judd built the engines that every Formula 3000 team used, although Zytek was tasked with maintaining the over 80 engines after they were built. Judd stopped production of the KV and the Formula 3000 series ended in 2004; contrary to rumour, Zytek did not use the  KV engine as a basis for the A1 Grand Prix units in 2005, but used their own V8 designed by ex-Judd engineer Hiro Kaneda.

Formula One 
In 1988, in conjunction with March Engineering, Judd made the move into the recently reintroduced normally aspirated variant of Formula One, which would completely replace turbocharged cars in 1989.  By using the existing BV V8 as the starting point for their new F1 engine, Judd saved cost while at the same time producing a customer engine that could compete on track and in the marketplace with the Ford-Cosworth V8s that were standard equipment for the (mostly smaller) teams competing to the new rules.

CV 

The first Formula One engine developed by Judd, the CV, was built to the 3.5-litre engine formula for naturally aspirated engines. The engine shared many design features with the Judd BV engine, but was expanded to 3.5 litres. March Engineering was the first team who signed to use the Judd CV. Reigning World Constructors' champion Williams was later forced also to turn to Judd, after they lost their supply of Honda engines for 1988. In addition, Ligier also bought CVs for use in the 1988 season. Judd-powered cars finished in podium positions four times during their debut season, with Williams' lead driver, Nigel Mansell, scoring Judd's first podium when he finished second at the 1988 British Grand Prix.

During the  season, the  Judd V8 was commonly the fastest of the non-turbo engines, and the Marches of Ivan Capelli and Maurício Gugelmin regularly recorded higher speeds through the speed trap than the Cosworth DFR- and DFZ-powered cars with Gugelmin recording the fastest "atmo" speed trap of the season when he hit  during qualifying for the German Grand Prix at Hockenheim (though this was still considerably slower than the turbo-powered McLaren-Hondas which were timed at ). At the 1988 Japanese Grand Prix Capelli's Judd-powered March 881 became the first naturally-aspirated car to lead a lap of a Grand Prix since , when he briefly passed the McLaren of two-time World Drivers' champion Alain Prost for the lead on lap 16 of the 51 lap race.

For the 1989 season, Judd developed the all-new narrow-angle Judd EV, with a more compact 76-degree V angle, rather than the more conventional 90 degrees of the Judd AV/BV/CV, and the Cosworth DFV series. Construction of the CV continued as a cheaper alternative for smaller teams. Team Lotus and EuroBrun were the only CV customers, with Lotus finishing sixth in the Constructors' Championship. EuroBrun was originally the only team to continue with the CV unit into 1990, but Life eventually bought CV units to replace their failed in-house W12 engine design.

EV

The previous Judd CV was designed with a conventional 90-degree engine block. Following the 1988 season it was decided that a narrower vee-angle would be adopted to give a more compact engine; the original intent was a 75-degree vee, but limitations in Judd's CNC equipment (it could only work in even-degree increments) meant that 76 degrees was used instead.

March Engineering upgraded their 1988 CV unit to an EV in 1989, while Brabham was also supplied with the new engines.  Brabham and March each scored one podium with the EV engine.  Both teams continued with the EV in 1990, although March Engineering was renamed Leyton House Racing.  Leyton House took the engine's only podium of the season, a second place at the French Grand Prix.  For 1991, Team Lotus was the only team to use the older EV.

GV

In the normally aspirated 3.5 litre formula, ten and twelve cylinder engines had proved to be more powerful than V8s.  This prompted Judd to replace the CV and EV V8s with an all-new engine in 1991 for the BMS Scuderia Italia team.  The new 72-degree angle V10 engine would carry the GV name.  The engine was powerful, helping the team to a podium finish in the San Marino Grand Prix.

Judd's agreement with Scuderia Italia ended following the 1991 season, leaving the GVs to be used by the Brabham team and newcomers Andrea Moda Formula in 1992.  Neither team scored a point all season and Judd Engines pulled out of Formula One.

Yamaha partnership
Following Judd's withdrawal from Formula One in 1992, John Judd turned to Yamaha to continue production of his engines. Once again, Tyrrell were unable to score any points all season. An improved OX10B for  boosted Tyrrell's performance, as the team scored a podium and finished sixth in the Constructors' Championship.

Rule changes in  saw the OX10C (known by Judd as the HV) reduced to 3 litres, although the architecture of the engine was generally the same.  Tyrrell's performance fell off again however, as the team scored five points and finished eighth in the championship.   saw the same points total from Tyrrell, although the new Yamaha OX11 (Judd JV) engine was an all-new design.  After 1996 Tyrrell switched to using Ford-branded engines.

Featuring a new bottom end, with changes consisting of a revised sump, crankshaft, oil pump and water pump; the OX11C had an extremely low centre of gravity (and a dry weight of 105 kg vs the Renault RS09's 121 kg) but was underpowered (708 bhp vs the RS09's 755 bhp) and most of all unreliable.

Consequently, a D-Spec was introduced for the fourth race, at Imola, with significant improvements in the airflow management of the combustion chamber area, which permitted the OX11D to gain 20 hp, which along with superior Bridgestone tyres propelled Damon Hill to a second place at the Hungaroring, the 11th race of a year that otherwise was pretty lacklustre with Pedro Diniz's 5th place at the Nürburgring as a last high point before Yamaha consequently pulled the plug on the failing project.

Complete Formula One World Championship results
(key) (Races in bold indicate pole position) (Races in italics indicate fastest lap)

Sports car racing

GV10

In 1991, the World Sportscar Championship introduced an engine formula nearly identical to Formula One.  This was an attempt to decrease cost by allowing sportscar teams to purchase Formula One engines, while at the same time encouraging major sportscar manufacturers to enter Formula One.  This allowed for Judd to offer their GV V10 to customers following modifications to meet the endurance requirements necessary in the World Sportscar Championship.

As financial troubles hit other teams, the Judd V10 became one of the few privately funded engines for the top C1 class.  Mazda was forced to turn to Judd to replace their outlawed rotary engines, although the GV10s would be rebadged as Mazda MV10s.  Euro Racing,  also purchased GV10s for their Lola T92/10s.  Mazda finished third in the team's championship while Euro Racing took fifth.

The World Sportscar Championship was cancelled in 1993, quickly ending Judd's first brief involvement in sports car racing.

GV4

After engine involvement with Yamaha in Formula One, Judd returned once again to sports car racing.  Believing that a large naturally aspirated engine would be fitting for use as a customer supply in the Sports Racing World Cup, Judd resurrected the GV10 from a few years earlier.  Expanded to four litres and upgraded with new technology, the new GV4 became a favorite choice for teams not running the dominant Ferrari 333 SP, eventually winning the championship with Racing for Holland in 2002 and 2003. In 2000 a Doran Ferrari 333 SP-Judd hybrid appeared, the performance of the Judd engine being deemed superior to that of the six-year-old Italian unit, which was no longer supported by Ferrari.

The engine's reliability record at Le Mans was still patchy and, while it could challenge for the pole in Domes and Dallaras, the engine RPMs had to be reduced to ensure it survived the race.

GV4.2

The 4.2-litre GV V10 engine was designed and developed for the 2013 season as a result of the remarkable success of the GV4 engine in the Boss series. Compared to the 4.0-litre GV V10 engine, the 4.2-litre GV V10 has been modernized; with lighter cylinder heads, twin-barrel throttles, and a lower centre of gravity. The engine is also 10 kg lighter than the 4-litre version. The engine made its race debut in April 2013 at the Hockenheim circuit in Germany, scoring a double victory on its debut. The engine was expertly installed in the Benetton chassis by Kevin Mansell.

Further success has followed in the 2014, 2015 and 2016 seasons.

KV675

In 2001, the Automobile Club de l'Ouest (ACO), organisers of the 24 Hours of Le Mans, announced new regulations for Le Mans Prototypes.  The smaller LMP675 category would allow naturally aspirated V8 engines up to 3.4 litres.  Using the design of the Formula 3000 KV V8, Judd expanded the engine to the maximum of 3.4 litres and reinforced it for endurance racing, creating the KV675.

In its debut year, the KV675 won the LMP675 championship in the American Le Mans Series for Dick Barbour Racing.  However, factory-supported efforts by MG and then Zytek were the dominant efforts in LMP675, so the KV675 only won its class at the 2004 24 Hours of Le Mans. It also won the LMP2 class championship in the ALMS in 2005. Both victories were for Intersport Racing, installed at the back of their Lola B2K/40.

GV5

In 2002, Judd introduced a variant of the GV4 known as the GV5.  The engine capacity increase to five litres was an attempt to reduce rpms, increase torque, and increase reliability.  The GV5 quickly proved its superiority over the GV4, when it took second place in the teams' championship in the Rolex Sports Car Series in its debut year with Doran.  Pescarolo Sport later went on to finish fourth at the 2004 24 Hours of Le Mans with a GV5.  The following year, Pescarolo finished in second place at Le Mans and won the teams' championship in the Le Mans Endurance Series.

The GV5 received an upgrade in 2006, using lighter materials to decrease the weight of the unit by 20 kg.  The GV5 S2 showed its performance by taking the Pescarolo to second place once again at Le Mans behind Audi's R10, as well as winning every event in the Le Mans Series season.

The engine was further upgraded in 2007, with an increase in displacement to 5.5 litres to produce more torque while attaining the maximum power at lower rpms and improving fuel consumption, as the Judd GV5.5 S2.

XV675

In an attempt to displace Ford and Cosworth as the only supplier of engines in the Champ Car World Series, Judd proposed a variant of the KV675 for use in the series through an agreement with MG, who would badge the engine.  The deal did not come to fruition, but the development work performed based on the KV675 to adapt it to Champ Car was transferred to sports car racing.  The improved engine, known as XV675, retained the 3.4-litre layout but included technology developed from the GV series of engines to increase revs and performance while reducing weight.

The XV675 debuted in 2004 with mixed success.  Ray Mallock Ltd. earned the XV675 one of its few successes, winning the LMP2 class at the 2005 24 Hours of Le Mans, but the team later switched to the Advanced Engine Research turbocharged LMP2 engine which had become dominant in the class. It was used until 2008.

DB 

On September 12, 2007, Engine Developments announced their plans for a replacement for the XV675, termed the DB.  Although it retained the 3.4-litre engine capacity, the unit was entirely new.  Judd planned to work closely with a top LMP2 team in order to get better testing out of the DB in 2008 before the engine was released to any customers. The engine is now found at the back of the numerous Lola B08/80 LMP2 cars in the LMS championship where it competes against the Zyteks and the rare Porsche RS Spyders.

Touring car racing
In 1997, Engine Developments was chosen by Nissan Motors to lead their engine development program on the Primera for the British Touring Car Championship.  Nissan went on to win the constructors' championship in 1998 and 1999, with Laurent Aïello winning the driver's title in 1999.

As part of MG's involvement with Judd elsewhere, the two worked together on MG's return to the British Touring Car Championship in 2004.  Judd developed the K2000 engine for the MG ZS, with Anthony Reid finishing fourth in the driver's championship in their debut year.  However, MG's financial troubles forced the company to drop out of the championship soon after, leaving the K2000 open to customers.  Des Wheatley installed the engine in an MG Metro and won the British Rallycross Championship.

References

External links 
 
 134judd.com  a private project to make the ultimative hillclimb machine (German)

Formula One engine manufacturers
Engine manufacturers of the United Kingdom